Viktoriya Viktorivna Olekh (born 2 October 1993) is a Ukrainian cross country skier who has competed internationally since 2011. She competed at the 2022 Winter Olympics, in Women's 10 kilometre classical, Women's 30 kilometre freestyle, Women's 15 kilometre skiathlon, Women's sprint, and Women's 4 × 5 kilometre relay.

Career
Olekh started her international career in 2011 when she participated at the 2011 European Youth Olympic Winter Festival in Liberec, Czech Republic where her best result was 36th in 7.5 km classical race. After that she participated at three FIS Nordic Junior World Ski Championships between 2011 and 2013 (with her best personal result being 54th in 10 km skiathlon in Turkish Erzerum in 2012). Olekh also took part in three Universiades (2013, 2015, and 2017), with her best individual finish being 28th in 5 km freestyle pursuit and best team result being 5th in 3x5 km relay (together with Tarasenko and Nasyko) both in 2017.

She debuted at World Cup on January 23, 2021, in Finnish Lahti where she finished 49th in skiathlon. As of January 2022, Olekh's best World Cup individual finish was 47th in a 10 km freestyle pursuit in Ruka, Finland, on November 28, 2021, and best World Cup team finish was 11th in a 4x5 km relay in Lahti, Finland, on January 24, 2021 (together with Antsybor, Kaminska, and Kovalova).

In 2022, Viktoriya Olekh was nominated for her first Winter Games in Beijing.

She participated at two FIS Nordic World Ski Championships. As of January 2022, her best individual finish was 46th in 30 km classical race in 2021.

Cross-country skiing results
All results are sourced from the International Ski Federation (FIS).

Olympic Games

World Championships

World Cup

Season standings

References

External links
 
 
 

1993 births
Living people
Ukrainian female cross-country skiers
Competitors at the 2013 Winter Universiade
Competitors at the 2015 Winter Universiade
Competitors at the 2017 Winter Universiade
Olympic cross-country skiers of Ukraine
Cross-country skiers at the 2022 Winter Olympics
People from Konotop
Sportspeople from Sumy Oblast